is a Japanese mixed-media project created by Homura Kawamoto and Hikaru Muno. It consisted of a collectible card game which debuted in October 2021, and an anime television series by Liden Films aired in the same month and ended in June 2022.

Characters

Media

Card game
The game's two starting decks and first booster pack was released on October 8, 2021.

Anime
The anime television series is produced by Liden Films and directed by Yuki Komada, with Yoriko Tomita writing the series' scripts, Shinpei Tomooka designing the characters, and Keiji Inai with Kenta Higashiohji composing the series' music. The first cour, titled Build Divide -#000000 (Code Black)-, aired from October 10 to December 26, 2021. Egoist performed the first opening theme "BANG!!!", while Memai Siren performed the first ending theme "Fukagyakuteki na Inochi no Shōzō". The second cour, titled Build Divide -#FFFFFF (Code White)-, aired from April 3 to June 26, 2022. Egoist performed the second opening theme "Gold", while Who-ya Extended performed the second ending theme "A Shout Of Triumph".  Crunchyroll and Funimation licensed the series outside of Asia. Medialink licensed the series in Southeast Asia and will stream it on iQIYI and Bilibili.

Episode list

BUILD-DIVIDE -#000000- CODE BLACK

BUILD-DIVIDE -#FFFFFF- CODE WHITE

References

External links
Official website 
Anime official website 

Aniplex
Card games in anime and manga
Collectible card games
Crunchyroll anime
Funimation
Medialink
Liden Films